Asprobacter is a Gram-negative and aerobic genus of bacteria from the family of Hyphomonadaceae with one known species (Asprobacter aquaticus). Asprobacter aquaticus has been isolated from fresh water.

References

Bacteria genera
Monotypic bacteria genera